Roland Ansieau (1901–1987) was an early 20th-century French art deco graphic artist,  best known for his 1935 "Berger 45" wine advertisement which is widely reproduced as poster prints.  Ansieau also created colorful illustrations for a 1931 seasonal guide to Deauville "the flowered beach".   Little else is known of his life or work.

1901 births
1987 deaths
French graphic designers
Art Deco artists